The 1958 season of the Venezuelan Primera División, the top category of Venezuelan football, was played by 5 teams. The national champions were Deportivo Portugués.

Results

Standings

External links
Venezuela 1958 season at RSSSF

Ven
Venezuelan Primera División seasons
1958 in Venezuelan sport